Mangelia sallespissensis is a minute extinct species of sea snail, a marine gastropod mollusk in the family Mangeliidae.

Description
The length of the shell attains 9 mm.

Distribution
This extinct marine species was found in the Miocene strata of Aquitaine, France.

References

External links
 Worldwide Mollusc Species Data Base: Mangelia sallespissensis

sallespissensis
Gastropods described in 1932